Diego Germán Dueñas Gómez (born 17 May 1990) is a Colombian racing cyclist who competes in para-cycling road and track events. At the 2016 and 2020 Summer Paralympics, he won the bronze medal in the individual pursuit.

References

External links
 

1990 births
Living people
Sportspeople from Bogotá
Colombian male cyclists
Paralympic cyclists of Colombia
Cyclists at the 2016 Summer Paralympics
Cyclists at the 2020 Summer Paralympics
Medalists at the 2016 Summer Paralympics
Medalists at the 2020 Summer Paralympics
Paralympic medalists in cycling
Paralympic bronze medalists for Colombia
20th-century Colombian people
21st-century Colombian people